Aleksandr Yevgenyevich Kanaplin (born 3 September 2000) is a Russian football player. He plays for FC Yenisey Krasnoyarsk.

Club career
He made his debut in the Russian Football National League for FC Yenisey Krasnoyarsk on 31 July 2021 in a game against FC Alania Vladikavkaz.

References

External links
 
 
 Profile by Russian Football National League

2000 births
Sportspeople from Rostov-on-Don
Living people
Russian footballers
Association football forwards
FC Strogino Moscow players
FC Yenisey Krasnoyarsk players
Russian First League players
Russian Second League players